Ervedosa do Douro is a civil parish in the municipality of São João da Pesqueira, Portugal. The population in 2011 was 1,294, in an area of 40.24 km2.

References

Freguesias of São João da Pesqueira